Gizri is one of the neighborhoods of Clifton Cantonment in the city of Karachi, Sindh, Pakistan. One of the oldest neighborhoods of Karachi was considered as Fishermen Village. There's still a small number of fisher live here who speak [[Bravhi & Sindhi language.Brohi Tribe is living in Gizri Since 1760 Later Came Khan of Kalat in 1949 In Gizri .. 
Gizri Is Famous for Baloch Tikka Wala (Since 1978) .. 
Many prominent scholars and well-known writers of Pakistan live in this area including Fatima Surayya Bajia, a playwright of many popular drama serials on Pakistan Television. She was laid to rest at Gizri graveyard after she died on 10 Feb 2016 at age 85. Her younger brother Anwar Maqsood Hameedi, who also is a major TV personality in Pakistan, led the funeral arrangements and her burial. Gizri also has the headquarter of Kyokushin Karate Club and the head of it was Sir Inamullah Khan.

Area's major ethnic groups
There are several ethnic groups living in Gizri including, majority of Bravies Sindhis, Punjabis, Kashmiris, Seraikis, Pakhtuns, Balochis, Memons and Gujratis.

Location within Karachi city
Gizri is located near the Gizri Creek close to the famous Clifton Beach on the Arabian Sea coast.

References

External links 

 Cantonment Board Clifton - Official site, Retrieved 27 July 2016
 

Neighbourhoods of Karachi
Restaurant districts and streets in Pakistan